"Touched by the Hand of God" is a song by English band New Order, released as a single on 7 December 1987. The song was originally recorded for the soundtrack to the film Salvation! and the version released as a single was remixed by Arthur Baker. The B-side was a dub remix, titled "Touched by the Hand of Dub", and the release had the catalogue number FAC 193; its production is credited to New Order.

Although not a track taken from a studio album, "Touched by the Hand of God" appears on the 2008 collector's edition of New Order's album Brotherhood in its remix version, on the 1994 compilation The Best of New Order and in remixed form on 1995's The Rest of New Order. In the US, the song was released as the B-side to the group's following single "Blue Monday 1988", though it was billed as a double A-side on the Billboard Hot Dance Club Play and Maxi-Singles charts.

Music video
The video that accompanied the song was directed by Kathryn Bigelow, and parodied glam metal groups of the same period, with the band miming to the music while wearing long wigs and leather clothing. The video also contains a love scene that is intercut with the performance shots, and stars Femi Gardiner and Bill Paxton. The concept was proposed by manager Rob Gretton, and was inspired by the band having seen the clichés of then-popular videos on MTV while touring America. Bassist Peter Hook said in a 2000 interview that one of the bands that served as inspiration for the spoof video was Mötley Crüe, whose song “Girls, Girls, Girls” played in heavy rotation on MTV at the time.

Track listings

Charts

Weekly charts

Year-end charts

References

External links
 

New Order (band) songs
1987 singles
1987 songs
Factory Records singles
Qwest Records singles
Songs written by Bernard Sumner
Songs written by Gillian Gilbert
Songs written by Peter Hook
Songs written by Stephen Morris (musician)
UK Independent Singles Chart number-one singles